Rugeley Town railway station serves the town of Rugeley, Staffordshire, England. The station is operated by West Midlands Railway, with services operated by West Midlands Railway and London Northwestern Railway. The station is situated around half a mile from Rugeley town centre. The station is located in Wharf Road.

History
The original station was opened by the London and North Western Railway on 1 June 1870. The station, together with all those on the line between Walsall and Rugeley Trent Valley, were closed on 18 January 1965 as part of the Beeching Axe, although the line remained open as freight-only. The station closed to goods on 6 September 1965.

A new station opened in 1997, some 250m south of the original, as the second stage of the reopening to passengers of the Chase Line saw the extension of services beyond Hednesford.  The following year, the short section of track between Rugeley Town and Rugeley Trent Valley stations was also reopened, allowing services to be extended via the Trent Valley section of the West Coast Main Line to Stafford (though through running there ended at the December 2008 timetable change).
In May 2019, a new service to London Euston started to run using Class 350s operated by London Northwestern Railway

In April 2011, the area was still mechanically signalled from the Brereton Sidings signal box immediately south of the station on the east side of the line (the sidings are no longer extant, though there is still an active rail connection to the adjacent coal-fired Rugeley power stations), but the box closed in 2013 (along with neighbouring Hednesford & Bloxwich boxes and the PSB at Walsall) as part of the ongoing West Midlands re-signalling scheme.  Control passed to the West Midlands Signalling Centre at Saltley, though in the long term the WCML South Rail Operating Centre at Rugby will have responsibility for this part of the country.

Services
On Monday to Saturday, there is a half hourly service northbound to Rugeley Trent Valley and southbound to Walsall and Birmingham New Street, with 1tph running to Birmingham International. On Sundays the service is hourly.

References

Further reading

External links

Rugeley
Railway stations in Staffordshire
DfT Category F2 stations
Former London and North Western Railway stations
Railway stations in Great Britain opened in 1870
Railway stations in Great Britain closed in 1965
Railway stations in Great Britain opened in 1997
Railway stations served by West Midlands Trains
Beeching closures in England
Reopened railway stations in Great Britain
1870 establishments in England